La Noche de Mr. Niebla (Spanish for "Mr. Niebla Night") was a major professional wrestling supercard show, produced and scripted by the Mexican Lucha Libre promotion Consejo Mundial de Lucha Libre (CMLL). The Sin Piedad show took place on January 24, 2020 in Arena México, Mexico City, Mexico, CMLL's main venue. The event was in homage of Mr. Niebla, a long time CMLL wrestler who died on December 23, 2019. It was the last CMLL event held before the start of the COVID-19 pandemic, which began in mid-March 2020.

The main event featured the storyline break up of La Peste Negra, a group Mr. Niebla help found, as Bárbaro Cavernario and El Felino attacked each other repeatedly during the Relevos increíbles six-man tag team match that saw Felino and his partners Último Guerrero, and Diamante Azul defeat Cavernario, Carístico, and Valiente by disqualification due to a foul from Cavernaro on El Felino.

Production

Background
Professional wrestler Efrén Tiburcio Márquez, commonly known under the ring name Mr. Niebla, died on December 23, 2019 from complications of a blood infection after dealing with health issues for several months leading up to his death. Prior to his death, CMLL had announced that they were holding a benefit show for Mr. Niebla on January 4 to help pay for his latest medical expenses, but with Mr. Niebla's passing it became a tribute show, El Ultimo Vuelo del Rey del Guaguanco ("The last dance of the King of Guaguanco"), with the money collected going to his family. The show was held at Deportivo Pavón in Mexico City and was streamed on +LuchaTV's YouTube channel.

Storylines
The event featured six professional wrestling matches with different wrestlers involved in pre-existing scripted feuds, plots and storylines. Wrestlers were portrayed as either heels (referred to as rudos in Mexico, those that portray the "bad guys") or faces (técnicos in Mexico, the "good guy" characters) as they followed a series of tension-building events, which culminated in a wrestling match or series of matches.

While the January 4 show was a benefit show for Mr. Niebla's family, CMLL later announced that they would hold a Friday night tribute show to Mr. Niebla on January 24, 2020. CMLL announced that Olímpico, Rey Bucanero, and Shocker would all wear their masks for one night, after having previously lost them in a Lucha de Apuestas (bet match). Shocker had in fact lost his mask to Mr. Niebla in 1999. For the main event, CMLL booked La Peste Negra team members El Felino and Bárbaro Cavernario on opposite teams in a Relevos increíbles six-man tag team match between members of Mr. Niebla's stable.

Aftermath
The developing feud between Felino and Bárbaro Cavernario led to the dissolution of La Peste Negra as well as the two being booked in the main event of the 2020 Homenaje a Dos Leyenas show, with both men risking their hair in a Lucha de Apuestas match.

Results

See also
2020 in professional wrestling

References

2020 in professional wrestling
Consejo Mundial de Lucha Libre shows
Events in Mexico City
January 2020 events in Mexico
Professional wrestling memorial shows